Melicope xanthoxyloides is a species of small tree in the family Rutaceae and is native to New Guinea and Queensland. It has trifoliate leaves and small green to yellow or cream-coloured flowers arranged in panicles in leaf axils.

Description

Taxonomy
Melicope xanthoxyloides was first formally described in 1864 by Ferdinand von Mueller who gave it the name Euodia xanthoxyloides and published the description in Fragmenta phytographiae Australiae from specimens collected near Rockingham Bay by John Dallachy. In 2001, Thomas Gordon Hartley changed the name to Melicope xanthoxyloides  in the journal Allertonia.

Distribution and habitat
It occurs in New Guinea including in the Bismarck Archipelago and from the McIlwraith Range on Cape York Peninsula to the Herbert River in northern Queensland.

Conservation status
This species is classified as of "least concern" under the Queensland Government Nature Conservation Act 1992.

References

xanthoxyloides
Sapindales of Australia
Flora of Queensland
Plants described in 1864
Taxa named by Ferdinand von Mueller